Randy J (Randy J. Shams) is the guitarist and founder of  the surf punk band The Tarantulas.

Life and work
Born in Orlando, Florida, Randy J moved to Los Angeles in 1987 and shortly thereafter began composing music for film trailers and TV.  After 6 years there, he moved back to Orlando and formed the surf band The Tarantulas in 1995.
In early 2000, Randy J relocated to Arizona and continues to record and perform as a solo artist and with The Tarantulas.

Major credits

Discography
 CD "Monster Wave...100 Feet High" (The Tarantulas, 1999)
 CD "The Tarantulas Greatest Hits" (The Tarantulas, 2004)
 CD "Don't Murder Anyone..." (The Tarantulas, 2006)
 CD "Songs of the Open Land" (Randy J, 1995)

Film
 Music for the film trailer of Unforgiven (Clint Eastwood, 1992)
 Music for the film trailer of A Perfect World (Clint Eastwood, 1993)

References

Surf musicians
American rock guitarists
American male guitarists
Living people
Year of birth missing (living people)